"I'm the One" is a song by heavy metal band Static-X. It is the first single from their album Start a War.

Track listing

Music video
The video clip for this song contains all the members of the band playing music in a room with special effects added to the video clip to make appear as if the video is splitting apart. It was directed by P. R. Brown.

Chart performance

References

2005 singles
Static-X songs
2005 songs
American heavy metal songs
Warner Records singles
Songs written by Tony Campos
Songs written by Wayne Static
Songs written by Tripp Eisen